1751 in philosophy

Events

Publications
 David Hume, An Enquiry Concerning the Principles of Morals (1751){01}

Births
 March 16 - James Madison (died 1836)

Deaths
 November 11 - Julien Offray de La Mettrie (born 1709)

Philosophy
18th-century philosophy
Philosophy by year